Bajaj Finance Limited (BFL), a subsidiary of Bajaj Finserv, is an Indian non-banking financial company headquartered in Pune.

History 
Originally incorporated as Bajaj Auto Finance Limited on March 25, 1987, as a non-banking financial company, primarily focused on providing two and three-wheeler finance. After 11 years in the auto finance market, Bajaj Auto Finance Ltd launched its initial public issue of equity share and was listed on the Bombay Stock Exchange and National Stock Exchange of India. At the turn of the 20th century, the company ventured into the consumer durables finance sector and started offering small-size loans at zero interest rates. In the subsequent years, Bajaj Auto Finance diversified into business and property loans as well.

In the year 2006, the company's assets under management hit the Rs.1,000 crore mark and are currently at Rs.52,332 crore. 2010 saw the company's registered name change from Bajaj Auto Finance Limited to Bajaj Finance Limited.

As of March 2022, the company deals in consumer lending, SME (small and medium-sized enterprises) lending, commercial lending, rural lending, deposits, and wealth management. And, has 294 consumer branches and 497 rural locations with over 33,000+ distribution points. The company reported a pre-tax profit of Rs.626 crores and a post-tax profit of Rs.408 crores at a ROA of 0.8% and ROE of 5.1% in Q2 FY17.

As of June 2022, Bajaj Finance has been working with RBL Bank and DBS Bank to issue co-branded credit cards. But, after the Reserve Bank of India opened the door for non-banking financial companies to enter the credit card industry, the company plans to introduce its credit card products by the beginning of the first quarter of 2023.

In January 2023, the company released its long-term strategy (LRS) to guide growth through different online and offline products. Under that strategy, Bajaj Finance launched its loan against property (LAP) business for micro, small, and medium-sized enterprise (MSME) customers, and has plans to launch new auto loans in the second quarter of 2024, microfinance in the fourth quarter of the same year, and tractor financing in the first quarter of 2025.

Funding and investments 
The parent company, Bajaj Finserv Limited, holds 57.28% of the total shares and has a controlling stake in the subsidiary. Other major investors include Maharashtra Scooters Limited, the Government of Singapore, Smallcap World Fund INC, and AXIS Long Term Equity Fund.

According to an exchange filing in 2022, the company's assets under management surpassed Rs 2 lakh crore, a 31 percent increase.

Investments 
In 2017-18, Bajaj Finance acquired a 12.6 percent interest in the mobile wallet company MobiKwik. Bajaj Finance and Sequoia Capital India had planned to sell MobiKwik shares worth around Rupees 69 crore and Rupees 95 crore, respectively, through an Initial Public Offering in 2021, which has been postponed due to the poor economic conditions.

In November 2022, Bajaj Finance announced its intention to acquire Mumbai-based SnapWork Technologies for ₹93 crores through a combination of primary and secondary transactions. The acquisition was anticipated to be completed before 31 December 2022.

Regulatory 
In September 2022, the Reserve Bank of India (RBI) has included Bajaj Finance as one of the 16 NBFCs that are part of the NBFC-Upper Layer list. This means that the RBI has requested that the company must develop and implement a board-approved policy for the adoption of the more stringent regulatory framework that is applicable to it.

References

Financial services companies of India
NIFTY 50
BSE SENSEX
1987 establishments in Maharashtra
Financial services companies established in 1987
Indian companies established in 1987
Companies listed on the National Stock Exchange of India
Companies listed on the Bombay Stock Exchange